Michelle R. Benson (born September 11, 1968) is an American accountant, politician, and Republican member of the Minnesota Senate. She represents District 31, which includes portions of Anoka, Isanti and Sherburne counties in the northern Twin Cities metropolitan area. Benson is the Deputy Majority Leader of the Minnesota Senate.

Early life, education, and career
Benson was raised on a farm near Murdock, Minnesota, graduating from Kerkhoven-Murdock-Sunburg High School. In 1991, Benson graduated from St. Catherine University in Saint Paul with a Bachelor of Arts in chemistry. In 1996, Benson received a Master of Business Administration from the University of St. Thomas. Benson, a certified public accountant, previously worked as an auditor and consultant at Deloitte & Touche and as executive director of a non-profit cybersecurity organization.

Minnesota Senate
In 2010, Benson challenged incumbent Debbie Johnson for the Republican nomination. Benson won the nomination and subsequently won the election. Benson was re-elected handily in 2012 and 2016. She currently serves as chair of the Senate Health and Human Services Finance and Policy Committee and is a deputy majority leader.

In 2015, she co-sponsored legislation that would allow businesses to refuse to provide services for same-sex couples.

In 2021, Michelle Benson called into question the ways in which the Minnesota government spent federal COVID-19 relief, dubbing the spending wasteful.

On August 31, 2021, Benson announced she was running for Governor of Minnesota. In her announcement, Benson promised to fight back against “radical, leftist policies” regarding the COVID-19 pandemic, and promised to deliver a "safer, better, and stronger" Minnesota.

Personal life
Benson has been a Boy Scout and Cub Scout leader, an administrator for a local Montessori school, and a member of the local chambers of commerce. Benson and her husband, Craig, live in Ham Lake with their three children.

References

External links

Senator Michelle Benson official Minnesota Senate website
Senator Michelle Benson official Minnesota Senate Republican Caucus page
Project Vote Smart - Senator Michelle Benson Profile

1968 births
Living people
People from Ham Lake, Minnesota
St. Catherine University alumni
University of St. Thomas (Minnesota) alumni
Republican Party Minnesota state senators
Women state legislators in Minnesota
21st-century American politicians
21st-century American women politicians
Government accounting officials
Women accountants
Auditors